The Cops is a British television police procedural drama series created by Jimmy Gardner, Robert Jones, and Anita J. Pandolfo, that first broadcast on BBC Two on 19 October 1998. Produced by World Productions, the series follows the lives of one shift of uniform officers based at Christie Road Police Station in the fictional town of Stanton, Greater Manchester. Billed as another attempt by the BBC to rival The Bill, the series was notable for its documentary-style camerawork and uncompromising portrayal of the police force. Although the series featured a number of notable actors across three series, Katy Cavanagh, Rob Dixon, and John Henshaw remained as the principal cast throughout.

The series was primarily filmed in Bolton, Greater Manchester. The first series was so controversial in its depiction of the police force that official police advice was withdrawn before the second series went into production. A total of twenty-four episodes were broadcast across three series, although the third series saw a slight change in the series format, featuring three two-part episodes each loosely tied together with an ongoing story arc. Although the second series attracted strong viewing figures and critical acclaim, resulting in the commission of a third series, creator Robert Jones later confirmed that the third series was written as a way of 'bringing The Cops to a close', with the final episode broadcast on 11 April 2001.

The first series was released on VHS on 24 January 2000, available as four individual volumes or as a complete box set. Both the second and third series remain commercially unreleased. All three series received a single re-run on UKTV Drama in the early 2000s, although have not been repeated since.

Reception
The programme won back-to-back British Academy Television Awards in the Best Drama Series category in 1999 and 2000, and was nominated for a third time in 2001, narrowly losing out to Clocking Off. Gordon Beverage, writing for the official 2000 BAFTA magazine, wrote; "All it took was a line of coke and the nation was hooked. It was a masterstroke from one of British television’s most successful directors, but then that’s what we’ve come to expect from Tony Garnett."

"Who else would have the nerve and ingenuity to kick-off a new police drama with a WPC snorting Class A in a toilet cubicle? Dixon of Dock Green it definitely isn’t, much to the chagrin of the duty office, not to mention the numerous members of the force who had hoped for something a little less provocative with The Cops. But pulling punches is not Tony’s style."

Critical reception was also extremely positive, with Mark Walker for Amazon writing; "It's grim up North for the cops in The Cops. Bolton, Lancashire (sic) doubles for the fictional Northern town of Stanton; Bolton's not such a bad place in reality, but here it looks like war-torn Beirut. Unlike their soft Southern counterparts, the cops in Stanton swear copiously, get involved in fistfights and generally behave badly. Little wonder when you contemplate the grim reality of their daily round among all the "dirty, thieving, lying scumbags" they have to deal with."

"This is soap opera masquerading as documentary, shot in subjective fly-on-the-wall fashion and with semi-improvised dialogue that enhances the documentary feel. There's no hummable theme tune and every episode leaps without preamble in media res into the thick of the action. The result is a show with all the character-driven tension of a soap combined with the voyeurism and unpredictability of docudrama. It's an original combination that makes for compulsive viewing."

Cast
 Katy Cavanagh as PC Mel Draper 
 Rob Dixon as Sgt. Edward Giffen
 John Henshaw as PC Roy Brammell 
 Clare McGlinn as PC Natalie Metcalf 
 Steve Jackson as PC Mike Thompson (Series 1—2)
 Jack Mardsen as PC Danny Rylands (Series 1—2)
 Danny Seward as PC Dean Wishaw 
 Parvez Qadir as PC Jaz Shundara 
 Steve Garti as PC Colin Jellicoe 
 Mark Chatterton as Ch. Insp. Newland 
 David Crellin as DS Alan Wakefield 
 Ken Kitson as Insp. Stowe 
 Paulette Williams as PC Amanda Kennett (Series 2)
 Kitty Simpson as PC Karen McQuire (Series 3)
 Michael McNally as PC John Martin (Series 3)
 Sue Cleaver as Duty Sgt. Standish (Series 1)
 David Prosho as Duty Sgt. Michaelson (Series 2—3)
 Margaret Blakemore as Cindy, CAD Operator 
 Mark Benson as SOCO Joe Smail

Episodes

Series 1 (1998)

Series 2 (1999)

Series 3 (2000–2001)

References

External links
The Cops at World Productions
The Cops at the British Film Institute

1998 British television series debuts
2001 British television series endings
1990s British crime drama television series
1990s British police procedural television series
1990s British workplace drama television series
2000s British crime drama television series
2000s British police procedural television series
2000s British workplace drama television series
BBC crime drama television shows
English-language television shows
Television shows set in Manchester
Television series by World Productions